Physca or Physka, Physcae or Physkai (Φύσκαι), Physcas or Physkas (Φύσκας), or Physcus or Physkos (Φύσκος), was a town of ancient Macedonia. It was placed by Ptolemy in the district of Mygdonia, and by others in that of Eordaea. Thucydides remarks that near it there still remained some of the descendants of the Eordaei, who had been expelled from all other parts of their original settlements by the Teminidae.

The site of Physca is unlocated.

References

Populated places in ancient Macedonia
Former populated places in Greece
Lost ancient cities and towns
Geography of ancient Mygdonia